Lisy Nos (literally, "fox's nose") is a municipal settlement in Primorsky District of the federal city of St. Petersburg, Russia, located on the cape of the same name in the northern part of the Kronstadt Bay. Population:  

The settlement originated in the mid-19th century as a dacha village near a coastal fort, or redoubt, designed to defend St. Petersburg from the projected British raid during the Crimean War. The Primorsky Railway (1871) runs through the settlement. It is the site of the Lisiy Nos railway station. The Saint Petersburg Dam runs south from Lisy Nos toward Kotlin Island.

References

Municipal settlements under jurisdiction of Saint Petersburg
Primorsky District, Saint Petersburg
Headlands of Russia
Landforms of Saint Petersburg